The Old Toronto Star Building was an Art Deco office tower in Toronto, Ontario, Canada. The building was located at 80 King Street West and was the headquarters of the Toronto Star newspaper from 1929 until 1970. The building was demolished in 1972 to make way for the construction of First Canadian Place.

Overview
The building was designed by the firm of Chapman and Oxley and opened in 1929. The front facade around the main entrance was clad in granite, the entrance itself having a bronze screen. The first three floors of the building were clad in granite; the upper floors in limestone. On the third floor, the facade was wrapped in elaborate stonework in geometric and floral motifs, which also adorned the interior and the limestone piers at the crest of the building. The first six floors were built in reinforced concrete, while the tower was built with a structural steel frame.

The first six stories held the offices of the Star, and the rest was rental office space. The 21st floor housed the newspaper's radio studios. The ground floor facing King Street housed a few retail stores and a Stoodleigh's Restaurant at the east end. The basement had a restaurant and barbershop.

Some stonework from the building can be found at Guild Park and Gardens, along with other portions of facades of lost buildings of Toronto.

In popular culture
Superman co-creator Joe Shuster, a Toronto native and former Star newsboy, used the building as a model for the Daily Planet Building.

See also
 
 
 First Canadian Place—previously the site for The Toronto Star building
 One Yonge Street—Current home of The Toronto Star
 Toronto Star
 Toronto Star Press Centre
 William H. Wright Building—former home of The Globe and Mail, located near the Star Building

References
 
 Notes

External links
 
 

1929 establishments in Ontario
1972 disestablishments in Ontario
Art Deco architecture in Canada
Buildings and structures demolished in 1972
Former skyscrapers
Chapman and Oxley buildings
Demolished buildings and structures in Toronto
Newspaper headquarters in Canada
Office buildings completed in 1929
Toronto Star